Cedric Dormaine Hill (born June 3, 1974) better known by his stage name E.S.G. (which stands for Everyday Street Gangsta or Everyday Serving God) is an American rapper from Houston, Texas, and is a member of the Screwed Up Click. He helped to popularize the "Chopped and Screwed" style of rap music. His debut album Ocean of Funk was released in 1994 and it contained the popular single "Swangin' & Bangin'", which would later be remixed in his follow-up Sailin' Da South. He has released 11 other albums since then. He is also credited with writing the hook for "Wanna be a Baller" on Lil Troy's album Sittin' Fat Down South.

Discography

Studio albums
1994: Ocean of Funk
1995: Sailin' Da South
1998: Return of the Living Dead
1999: Shinin' n' Grindin'
2000: City Under Siege
2004: All American Gangsta
2006: Screwed Up Movement
2009: Digital Dope: The Reintroduction
2009: Everyday Street Gangsta
2011: Owner's Manual
2015: Kingish

Compilation albums
2008: The Chronicles 
2009: Greatest Independent Hits

Collaborative albums
2001: Boss Hogg Outlaws (with Slim Thug)

See also
Houston hip hop

References

Rappers from Houston
Screwed Up Click members
Southern hip hop musicians
Underground rappers
Gangsta rappers
1969 births
Living people
20th-century American rappers
21st-century American rappers
African-American male rappers
20th-century American male musicians
21st-century American male musicians
20th-century African-American musicians
21st-century African-American musicians